The Brightest Light is a tenth studio album by The Mission released on 20 September 2013.

Critical reception

PopMatters magazine wrote "For the repetition, occasional triteness and borrowed elements, The Brightest Light isn't a perfect album from the Mission. That said, it is very good and has the potential to please established fans as well as the newly interested. If nothing else, The Brightest Light is a fine argument for the case that "Goth Rock lives."

Track listing
All songs were written by Wayne Hussey, except where noted

CD1:
"Black Cat Bone" – 8:06
"Everything But the Squeal" – 4:56
"Sometimes the Brightest Light Comes from the Darkest Place" – 5:29
"Born Under a Good Sign" – 4:14
"The Girl in a Furskin Rug" – 3:49
"When the Trap Clicks Shut Behind Us" – 4:47
"Ain't No Prayer in the Bible Can Save Me Now" – 5:15
"Just Another Pawn in Your Game" – 3:47
"From the Oyster Comes the Pearl" – 5:13
"Swan Song" (Hussey, David M. Allen) – 7:06
"Litany for the Faithful" – 7:11
CD2:
"Drag" – 2:57
"I'm Fallin' Again" – 5:46
"The Long Way 'Round Is Sometimes the Only Way Home" – 3:54
"The Girl in a Furskin Rug" (Wayne Hussey demo) – 3:46
"Born Under a Good Sign" (Wayne Hussey demo) – 4:48
"Black Cat Bone" (Wayne Hussey demo) – 4:37
"From the Oyster Comes the Pearl" (Wayne Hussey demo) – 4:38
"When the Trap Clicks Shut Behind Us" (Wayne Hussey demo) – 4:45
"Ain't No Prayer in the Bible Can Save Me Now" (Wayne Hussey demo with Erica Nockalls) – 5:37

Personnel

The Mission 
 Craig Adams – bass guitar
 Simon Hinkler – guitar, keyboards
 Wayne Hussey – vocals, guitars
 Mike Kelly – drums

Additional personnel 
 David M. Allen – production

References

2013 albums
The Mission (band) albums
Albums produced by David M. Allen